Alfred Hicks (10 August 1916 – 20 June 1999) was a South African cricketer. He played in thirty first-class matches from 1946/47 to 1956/57.

References

External links
 

1916 births
1999 deaths
South African cricketers
Border cricketers
Eastern Province cricketers
Cricketers from Cape Town